is a railway station on the East Japan Railway Company (JR East) Tsugaru Line located in the town of Imabetsu, Aomori Prefecture, Japan.

Lines

Station layout
Tsugaru-Futamata Station has one side platform serving a single bi-directional track. The station is unattended. The station building also doubles as Michi-no-eki Imabetsu serving vehicular traffic.

History
Tsugaru-Futamata Station was opened on October 21, 1958 as a station on the Japanese National Railways (JNR). Scheduled freight operations were discontinued from October 20, 1968. With the privatization of the JNR on April 1, 1987, it came under the operational control of JR East.

Surrounding area
The station is next to the  Station of the Hokkaido Shinkansen (which runs immediately adjacent and parallel to Tsugaru-Futamata). Prior to the opening of Okutsugaru-Imabetsu Station, there was the Tsugaru-Imabetsu Station on the Kaikyō Line at the same location, which was connected by a stairway.

See also
 List of Railway Stations in Japan

External links

 

Stations of East Japan Railway Company
Railway stations in Aomori Prefecture
Tsugaru Line
Imabetsu, Aomori
Railway stations in Japan opened in 1958